Katherina Roshana (born March 27, 1990, in Brooklyn, New York) is an American-born of Indian descent Guyanese pageant titleholder who was crowned Miss Guyana 2013 and represented her country at Miss Universe 2013 in Russia.

Early life
Roshana is a graduate of Oriental Medicine in Long Island, New York. She hopes to become a doctor of Oriental Medicine. She attended the Georgetown International Academy in Guyana from Kindergarten through her graduation in 2008.

Miss Guyana 2013
The 22-year-old beauty, Katherina Roshana was crowned Miss Guyana, Sunday evening at the poolside of the Pegasus Hotel in Kingston, Georgetown.
Roshana, whose platform was autism, represented Guyana at the Miss Universe 2013 pageant on November 9 in Moscow, Russia but failed to place in the semifinals.

References

1990 births
Living people
Guyanese beauty pageant winners
Guyanese people of Indian descent
Guyanese female models
Miss Universe 2013 contestants
People from Brooklyn
Models from New York City
American people of Guyanese descent